Bagpipes are a woodwind instrument.

Bagpipes may also refer to:

 "Bagpipes" (How I Met Your Mother), a 2009 television episode
 Johnny Bagpipes, Australian snake catcher featured in the TV series Snake Boss
 Terence "Bagpipes" De La Croix, a fictional character in the British TV series In the Long Run